Gauteng province of South Africa is divided, for local government purposes, into three metropolitan municipalities and two district municipalities. The district municipalities are in turn divided into six local municipalities.

District and metropolitan municipalities

Local and metropolitan municipalities

Former municipalities
These municipalities have been dissolved since the current system of local government was established in 2000.

References

 
Gauteng
Gauteng-related lists